C200 may refer to:

Chrysler C-200, a 1952 concept car created by Chrysler
Honda Super Cub C200 
Macchi C.200, a World War II fighter plane manufactured in Italy
Mercedes C200, is a model of compact executive car produced by the Mercedes-Benz division of Daimler AG
SsangYong C200, a future automobile planned for production in late 2009 by Korean automaker SsangYong Motor Company
Sansa c200, is a model of flash memory-based digital audio players and portable media players produced by SanDisk

See also
 Chrysler 200C EV, a plug-in hybrid electric concept car created by Chrysler